MacKillop is a single-member electoral district for the South Australian House of Assembly. It was named in 1991 after Sister Mary MacKillop who served the local area, and later became the first Australian to be canonised as a Roman Catholic saint. MacKillop is a 25,313 km² rural electorate in the south-east of the state, stretching south and west from the mouth of the Murray River to the Victorian State border, but excluding the far-southern point of the state, (which includes Mount Gambier). It contains the Kingston District Council, Naracoorte Lucindale Council, District Council of Robe, Tatiara District Council, Wattle Range Council, as well as parts of The Coorong District Council. The main population centres are Bordertown, Keith, Kingston SE, Meningie, Millicent, Naracoorte, Penola and Robe.

MacKillop was first contested at the 1993 election, essentially as a reconfigured version of the old electoral district of Victoria. Like its predecessor, it is a comfortably safe Liberal seat. Counting its time as Victoria, the seat has been held by the Liberals or their predecessors, the Liberal and Country League, for all but two terms since the switch to single-member seats in 1938.

The last member for Victoria, Dale Baker, a former state leader of the Liberal Party, transferred to MacKillop and won it easily. Baker went on to serve as a minister in the Brown and Olsen governments before being unseated at the 1997 election by Mitch Williams, who ran as an independent after losing a preselection battle with Baker. Williams returned to the Liberal Party in 1999 and was easily re-elected as a Liberal at the 2002 election. He held the seat without serious difficulty until his retirement in 2018, handing the seat to fellow Liberal Nick McBride.

The seat is almost entirely within the equally conservative federal seat of Barker.

Members for MacKillop

Election results

Notes

References
 ECSA profile for MacKillop: 2018
 ABC profile for MacKillop: 2018
 Poll Bludger profile for MacKillop: 2018

Electoral districts of South Australia
1993 establishments in Australia